Cyril Kennedy may refer to:
 Cyril Kennedy (Canadian politician)
 Cyril Kennedy (Australian politician)